Eduard Kuznetsov (born August 6, 1967, Barabash) is a Russian political figure and a deputy of the 8th State Duma.

In 1988, Kuznetsov graduated from the Sverdlovsk Higher Military-Political Tank Artillery School. From 1994 to 2001, he worked in various commercial organizations and later continued his career at the state authorities of the Krasnodar Krai. Soon he became a member of the Russian Union of Industrialists and Entrepreneurs. From 2017 to 2021, he was the deputy of the Legislative Assembly of Krasnodar Krai. Since September 2021, he has served as deputy of the 8th State Duma.

Sanctions
In December 2022 the EU sanctioned Eduard Kuznetsov in relation to the 2022 Russian invasion of Ukraine.

References

1967 births
Living people
United Russia politicians
21st-century Russian politicians
Eighth convocation members of the State Duma (Russian Federation)